Puno is an Andean city in Peru.

Puno or PUNO may also refer to:

Places
Puno District, a district in the Puno Province
Puno Province, a province in the Puno Region in Peru
Puno Region, a region in Peru

People
Carlito Puno, Philippine technocrat
Práxedes Fajardo y Puno, Philippine revolutionary
Reynato Puno, Philippine judge
Ricardo Concepción Puno, Philippine jurist
Ricardo Villanueva Puno, Philippine journalist
Rico E. Puno, Philippine technocrat
Rico J. Puno, Philippine singer
Roberto Puno, Philippine politician
Ronaldo Puno, Philippine politician

Institutions
Polish University Abroad

Others
Puño Airlines, a fake airline used to entrap fugitives